Jusuf Nurkić (born 23 August 1994), nicknamed "the Bosnian Beast", is a Bosnian professional basketball player for the Portland Trail Blazers of the National Basketball Association (NBA).
He also represents the Bosnia and Herzegovina national team internationally.

Early career
Born in Živinice, Bosnia and Herzegovina, Nurkić began playing basketball at 14 years of age, after Bosnian sports agent Enes Trnovčević took him to Slovenia and gave him an opportunity to play. He played in the youth categories for Slovenian team Zlatorog Laško. In February 2012, he was briefly loaned to Union Olimpija in order to play the Nike International Junior Tournament which was held in Belgrade. Nurkić attracted attention internationally by averaging 18.8 points and 11 rebounds over 5 games. Shortly after the tournament, he parted ways with Zlatorog Laško. Just days after, it was revealed that Nurkić was training with Croatian team Cedevita.

Professional career

Cedevita Zagreb (2012–2014)
In October 2012, after a few months of training with Croatian team Cedevita, Nurkić signed a contract with Cedevita Zagreb. In his first season with Cedevita, he had a small role in the team under head coach Aleksandar Petrović, mostly playing in garbage time. In the Euroleague, he played only 6 games, averaging 1.8 points per game. In January 2013, Nurkić was loaned to Zadar until the end of the season on his initiative, hoping to play more minutes. In his second season, under new head coach Jasmin Repeša, he had breakthroughs in the regional Adriatic League, averaging 11.6 points and 5.6 rebounds per game, for only 16.3 minutes spent on the court. This was attributed mainly to foul troubles and conditioning issues.

In 2014, Nurkić was nominated for the FIBA Europe Young Player of the Year Award.

Denver Nuggets (2014–2017)
On 26 June 2014, Nurkić was selected by the Chicago Bulls with the 16th overall pick in the 2014 NBA draft. He was later traded to the Denver Nuggets on draft night. On 31 July 2014, he signed his rookie scale contract with the Nuggets. On 29 October 2014, he made his NBA debut, recording 5 points and 7 rebounds in an 89–79 win over the Detroit Pistons. On 1 January 2015, he recorded his first career double-double with 10 points and 10 rebounds in a loss to the Chicago Bulls. Two days later, he recorded his second career double-double with 11 points and 10 rebounds to go with 5 blocks in a 114–85 win over the Memphis Grizzlies. He went on to record two more double-doubles in February. Nurkić was named a participant in the 2015 Rising Stars Challenge as a replacement for Steven Adams of the Oklahoma City Thunder, but declined to play in the event for personal reasons. In the Nuggets' final game of the season on 15 April, he scored a season-high 17 points in a loss to the Golden State Warriors. On 20 May, he underwent successful surgery to repair a partially torn left patellar tendon.

On 11 October 2015, the Nuggets exercised their third-year team option on Nurkić's rookie scale contract, extending the contract through the 2016–17 season. He made his 2015–16 season debut on 2 January against the Golden State Warriors, having been inactive for the first two months of the season due to recovering from his torn left patellar tendon. Four days later, he recorded 15 points, 10 rebounds and 5 blocks in a 78–74 win over the Minnesota Timberwolves. On 12 March, he scored a season-high 17 points in a 116–100 win over the Washington Wizards. He topped that mark twice in late March, scoring 18 points against the Los Angeles Lakers on 25 March, and 19 points against the Los Angeles Clippers on 27 March. On 8 April, he scored a career-high 21 points in a 102–98 win over the San Antonio Spurs.

In the Nuggets' 2016–17 season opener on 26 October 2016, Nurkić set a new career high with 23 points in a 107–102 win over the New Orleans Pelicans. Five days later, he grabbed a career-high 18 rebounds in a 105–102 loss to the Toronto Raptors. After Nikola Jokić emerged as Denver's starting center, Nurkić was demoted to the bench. The demotion to the bench didn't sit well with Nurkić, and he wasn't afraid to voice his displeasure with the situation, requesting to be traded twice, first in April 2016 and then again in December 2016. The Nuggets eventually granted Nurkić his wish ten days before the 2017 trade deadline.

Portland Trail Blazers (2017–present)

First years in Portland (2017–2019)
 

On 13 February 2017, Nurkić was traded, along with the rights to the Memphis Grizzlies' 2017 first round draft pick, to the Portland Trail Blazers in exchange for Mason Plumlee, a 2018 second round pick and cash considerations. He made his debut for the Trail Blazers two days later, recording 13 points and seven rebounds in 21 minutes off the bench in a 111–88 loss to the Utah Jazz. He made his first start for the Trail Blazers in the following game on 23 February 2017, recording 12 points and 12 rebounds in a 112–103 win over the Orlando Magic. On 2 March 2017, he had 18 points, 12 rebounds, a career-high six assists and five blocks in a 114–109 win over the Oklahoma City Thunder. On 9 March 2017, he had a career-high 28 points and 20 rebounds in a 114–108 overtime win over the Philadelphia 76ers. He also had eight assists and six blocks, becoming the first NBA player to post at least 28 points, 20 rebounds, 8 assists and 6 blocks in a game since Charles Barkley pulled the feat in November 1986. On 28 March 2017, he set a new career high with 33 points to go with 16 rebounds in a 122–113 win over his former team, the Denver Nuggets. Three days later, he was ruled out for the rest of the regular season with a non-displaced fracture in his right leg.

On 22 April 2017, Nurkić returned to action in Game 3 of the Trail Blazers' first-round playoff series against the Golden State Warriors, after having missed the final seven games of the regular season and the first two playoff games at Golden State. He finished with two points and 11 rebounds, as the Trail Blazers went down 3–0 in the series with a 119–113 loss. He went on to miss Game 4 of the series, as the Trail Blazers bowed out of the playoffs with a 4–0 series loss to the Warriors.

On 24 November 2017, Nurkić recorded 29 points and 15 rebounds in a 127–125 win over the Brooklyn Nets. On 18 January 2018, he had 19 points and a season-high 17 rebounds in a 100–86 win over the Indiana Pacers. On 9 April 2018, he had 20 points and 19 rebounds in an 88–82 loss to the Nuggets. In Game 4 of the Trail Blazers' first-round playoff series against the New Orleans Pelicans, Nurkić recorded 18 points and 11 rebounds in a 131–123 loss. The loss eliminated Portland from the playoffs, as they lost the series in a four-game sweep.

On 6 July 2018, Nurkić re-signed with the Trail Blazers. On 22 October 2018, he recorded 22 points and 18 rebounds in a 125–124 overtime loss to the Washington Wizards. On 18 November 2018, he had 13 points, 14 rebounds and matched his career high with eight assists in a 119–109 win over the Wizards. Two days later, he had 13 points and 11 rebounds in a 118–114 win over the New York Knicks, thus recording his career-best fifth straight double-double. On 27 December, he had 27 points and 12 rebounds in a 110–109 overtime win over the Warriors. On 1 January 2019, he had 24 points and a career-high 23 rebounds to go with seven assists, five blocks and five steals in a 113–108 overtime win over the Sacramento Kings, becoming the only player to post such a stat line in NBA history. On 11 January, he had 11 points, 11 rebounds and tied career highs with eight assists and six blocks in a 127–96 win over the Charlotte Hornets, becoming the third player in NBA history to record such a stat line in fewer than 30 minutes. On 16 January, he recorded his first career triple-double with 10 points, 10 rebounds and 10 assists in a 129–112 win over the Cleveland Cavaliers.

Injury-plagued seasons (2019–present)
On 1 January 2019, Nurkić logged a career-high 23 rebounds in a 113–108 overtime win against the Sacramento Kings. On 25 March 2019, Nurkić suffered a compound fracture of his left tibia and fibula in the second overtime of the Trail Blazers' 148–144 win over the Brooklyn Nets. Nurkić had a season-high 32 points and 16 rebounds before the injury. The Trail Blazers confirmed that it was a season-ending injury the same night.

Nurkic was expected to return 15 March 2020 from his injury. However, with the suspension of the 2019–20 NBA season, he did not make his return until 31 July 2020, in a 140–135 overtime win against the Memphis Grizzlies. He recorded 18 points, nine rebounds and six blocks in the contest.

On 14 January 2021, Nurkić fractured his right wrist in an 87–111 blowout loss to the Indiana Pacers. He made his return on 26 March 2021, recording eight points and eight rebounds in a 112–105 win over the Orlando Magic. On 23 April 2021, Nurkić logged a season-high 26 points in a 128–130 loss to the Memphis Grizzlies.

On 6 January 2022, during the fourth quarter of a 109–115 loss to the Miami Heat, Nurkić was ejected from the game after an altercation with Heat guard Tyler Herro. The next day, the NBA fined both Nurkić and Herro $25,000 each for the incident. On 22 January, Nurkic scored 29 points, including a go-ahead basket with 13 seconds left, and grabbed 17 rebounds in a 109-105 victory against the Boston Celtics. On 22 March, he was fined $40,000 by the NBA for a confrontation with a fan two days earlier after a 98–129 blowout loss to the Indiana Pacers, during which Nurkić threw the fan's phone into the stands. On 28 March, Nurkić was ruled out for the remainder of the season with plantar fasciitis in his left foot.

On 6 July 2022, Nurkić re-signed with the Trail Blazers on a four-year, $70 million contract.

National team career
Playing for Bosnia and Herzegovina, Nurkić was named MVP of the FIBA Europe Under-18 Championship Division B held in 2012, where he averaged 19.4 points and 13.3 rebounds per game. He was also MVP of the FIBA Europe Under-20 Championship Division B, held in 2014, where he averaged 21.4 points and 12.0 rebounds per game. He played a minor role in the senior team of Bosnia and Herzegovina during the FIBA EuroBasket 2013 qualification, but did not make the squad for the final tournament due to the conflict with the board of Bosnian National Basketball Association. Nurkić represented the senior Bosnia and Herzegovina national basketball team during Eurobasket 2017 qualification. He averaged 19.2 points, 13.5 rebounds and 1.0 blocks per game.

Nurkić represented Bosnia and Herzegovina at EuroBasket 2022, where the team was eliminated in the group stage. He helped his country get a "shock win", 97–93, against the defending champions Slovenia. Nurkić averaged 16.2 points and 7 rebounds over the tournament.

Career statistics

NBA

Regular season

|-
| style="text-align:left;"| 
| style="text-align:left;"| Denver
| 62 || 27 || 17.8 || .446 || .000 || .636 || 6.2 || .8 || .8 || 1.1 || 6.9 
|- 
| style="text-align:left;"| 
| style="text-align:left;"| Denver
| 32 || 3 || 17.1 || .417 || .000 || .616 || 5.5 || 1.3 || .8 || 1.4 || 8.2 
|-
| style="text-align:left;"| 
| style="text-align:left;"| Denver
| 45 || 29 || 17.9 || .507 || .000 || .496 || 5.8 || 1.3 || .6 || .8 || 8.0 
|-
| style="text-align:left;"| 
| style="text-align:left;"| Portland
| 20 || 19 || 29.2 || .508 || .000 || .660 || 10.4 || 3.2  || 1.3 || 1.9 || 15.2
|-
| style="text-align:left;"| 
| style="text-align:left;"| Portland
| 79 || 79 || 26.4 || .505 || .000 || .630 || 9.0 || 1.8 || .8 || 1.4 || 14.3 
|-
| style="text-align:left;"| 
| style="text-align:left;"| Portland
| 72 || 72 || 27.3 || .508 || .103 || .773 || 10.4 || 3.2 || 1.0 || 1.4 || 15.6 
|-
| style="text-align:left;"| 
| style="text-align:left;"| Portland
| 8 || 8 || 31.6 || .495 || .200 || .886 || 10.3 || 4.0 || 1.4 || 2.0 || 17.6 
|-
| style="text-align:left;"| 
| style="text-align:left;"| Portland
| 37 || 37 || 23.8 || .514 || .400 || .619 || 9.0 || 3.4 || 1.0 || 1.1 || 11.5
|-
| style="text-align:left;"| 
| style="text-align:left;"| Portland
| 56 || 56 || 28.2 || .535 || .268 || .690 || 11.1 || 2.8 || 1.1 || .6 || 15.0
|- class="sortbottom"
| style="text-align:center;" colspan="2"| Career
| 411 || 330 || 23.9 || .500 || .232 || .672 || 8.5 || 2.2 || .9 || 1.2 || 12.2

Playoffs

|-
| style="text-align:left;"| 2017
| style="text-align:left;"| Portland
| 1 || 1 || 17.0 || .333 || .000 || .000 || 11.0 || 4.0 || .0 || 1.0 || 2.0
|-
| style="text-align:left;"| 2018
| style="text-align:left;"| Portland
| 4 || 4 || 23.5 || .487 || .000 || .818 || 8.0 || 1.0 || 1.5 || 1.3 || 11.8
|-
| style="text-align:left;"| 2020
| style="text-align:left;"| Portland
| 5 || 5 || 32.2 || .439 || .273 || .783 || 10.4 || 3.6 || 1.4 || .2 || 14.2
|-
| style="text-align:left;"| 2021
| style="text-align:left;"| Portland
| 6 || 6 || 28.8 || .545 || .200 || .720 || 10.3 || 2.7 || .5 || 1.2 || 13.2
|- class="sortbottom"
| style="text-align:center;" colspan="2"| Career
| 16 || 16 || 27.8 || .487 || .235 || .763 || 9.8 || 2.6 || 1.0 || .9 || 12.4

EuroLeague

|-
| style="text-align:left;"| 2012–13
| style="text-align:left;"| Cedevita
| 6 || 0 || 3.7 || .625 || 1.000 || .000 || .7 || .0 || .2 || .5 || 1.8 || 2.0
|- class="sortbottom"
| style="text-align:center;" colspan="2"| Career
| 6 || 0 || 3.7 || .625 || 1.000 || .000 || .7 || .0 || .2 || .5 || 1.8 || 2.0

Domestic leagues

Personal life
Nurkić's father, Hariz, is a police officer in Bosnia and Herzegovina and according to Denver Nuggets' broadcasters, he stands 7 feet (2.13 m) tall and weighs over 400 pounds (181 kg). In an interview with ESPN's Rachel Nichols, Nurkić confirmed his father's enormous physical stature and that his younger brother is already wearing size 16 shoes at age 13.

See also

 List of European basketball players in the United States

References

External links

 
 Jusuf Nurkić at abaliga.com
 Jusuf Nurkić at eurobasket.com
 Jusuf Nurkić at euroleague.net
 

1994 births
Living people
ABA League players
Bosnia and Herzegovina men's basketball players
Bosnia and Herzegovina expatriate basketball people in the United States
Bosniaks of Bosnia and Herzegovina
Bosnia and Herzegovina Muslims
Centers (basketball)
Chicago Bulls draft picks
Denver Nuggets players
KK Cedevita players
KK Zadar players
National Basketball Association players from Bosnia and Herzegovina
Portland Trail Blazers players
People from Živinice